Charles A. Armbruster (August 30, 1880 – October 7, 1964) was a backup catcher in Major League Baseball who played from 1905 through 1907 for the Boston Americans and the Chicago White Sox.

Biography
A native of Cincinnati, Ohio, Ambruster shared catching duties with Lou Criger for the Boston Americans in part of three seasons. In 1906 he appeared in a career-high 72 games and hit .144 (21-for-201). In a three-year career, Ambruster was a .149 hitter (53-for-355)  with 24 runs and 12 RBI in 131 games.  He batted and threw right-handed. Ambruster died in Grants Pass, Oregon at the age of 84.

See also
Boston Red Sox all-time roster
Chicago White Sox all-time roster

References

External links
Retrosheet
Baseball Reference

Baseball Almanac

1880 births
1964 deaths
Baseball players from Cincinnati
Boston Americans players
Chicago White Sox players
Cincinnati Cams players
Grand Rapids Wolverines players
Holyoke Papermakers players
Major League Baseball catchers
New London Whalers players
Portland Beavers players
Portland Colts players